Tinacrucis is a genus of moths belonging to the subfamily Tortricinae of the family Tortricidae.

With marked sexual dimorphism. Found in Mexico and Central America, with one species reaching the mountains of Arizona.

Species
Tinacrucis apertana (Walsingham, 1914)
Tinacrucis aquila (Busck, 1914)
Tinacrucis atopa Razowski & Wojtusiak, 2008
Tinacrucis noroesta Powell, 2009
Tinacrucis patulana (Walker, 1863)
Tinacrucis sebasta (Walsingham, 1914)

See also
List of Tortricidae genera

References

 , 2005: World catalogue of insects volume 5 Tortricidae.
 , 1986, Pan-Pacif. Ent. 62: 386.
 , 2009: Tinacrucis noroesta, new species, North America's largest Tortrine moth (Tortricidae: Atteriini). Journal of the Lepidopterists' Society 63 (1): 27–30.
 , 2005, World Catalogue of Insects 5

External links
tortricidae.com

Atteriini
Tortricidae genera